The Madhya Pradesh College of Homoeopathy, Raipur, is one of the five colleges of Homeopathy in Central India, operated under rules set by the state governments of Madhya Pradesh and Chhattisgarh.

Established
The College was established in 2009 in Raipur.

Affiliation
The college is affiliated with Pandit Ravishankar Shukla University, Raipur (C.G.) and Barkatullah University, Bhopal.

Number of O.P.D
The college presently has two students, with seven at the Jabalpur site.

Courses offered
B.H.M.S.
B.H.M.S. Pre
Surgery
Optimaology
B.H.M.S. P.G.

Admissions
The students are admitted on the basis of merit in the P.A.H.U.T. Exam conducted by VYAPAM in Madhya Pradesh and P.H.E Exam in Chhattisgarh

Other colleges of homeopathy
 Madhya Pradesh College of Homoepathy, Bhopal
 Madhya Pradesh College of Homoepathy, Indore
 M.P.C.H, Gwalior
 M.P.C.H, Jabalpur

References

Raipur district website

Universities and colleges in Chhattisgarh
Education in Raipur, Chhattisgarh
Homeopathic colleges